Quoyula is a genus of sea snails, marine gastropod mollusks in the family Muricidae, the murex snails or rock snails.

This genus has become a synonym of Coralliophila H. Adams & A. Adams, 1853

Species
Species within the genus Quoyula include:

 Quoyula madreporarum (Sowerby, 1832): synonym of Coralliophila monodonta (Blainville, 1832)
 Quoyula monodonta Quoy & Gaimard: synonym of Coralliophila monodonta (Blainville, 1832)

References

Coralliophilinae